Katsuya Kakunaka (角中 勝也, born May 25, 1987) is a Japanese professional baseball outfielder for the Chiba Lotte Marines in Japan's Nippon Professional Baseball.

External links

NPB

1987 births
Living people
Baseball people from Ishikawa Prefecture
Japanese baseball players
Nippon Professional Baseball outfielders
Chiba Lotte Marines players
2013 World Baseball Classic players
Kōchi Fighting Dogs players
People from Nanao, Ishikawa